Oszkowice  is a village in the administrative district of Gmina Bielawy, within Łowicz County, Łódź Voivodeship, in central Poland.Gapa It lies approximately  west of Łowicz and  north of the regional capital Łódź.

References

Oszkowice